Nataxa flavescens, the yellow-headed anthelid, is a species of moth of the family Anthelidae first described by Francis Walker in 1855. It is found in Australasia.

The wingspan of the grey-winged female is approximately 40 mm.  That of the male is approximately 30 mm.

References

External links
Nataxa flavescens

Moths described in 1855
Anthelidae
Moths of Asia
Moths of Australia